Stanley John Webb (born 6 December 1947) is a former English footballer who scored 40 goals from 167 appearances in the Football League playing for Middlesbrough, Carlisle United, Brentford and Darlington in the 1970s. A forward, he also played non-league football for clubs including Whitby Town and Guisborough Town, for whom he scored the club's first FA Cup goal, in the 1978–79 first qualifying round against Consett.

Webb attended Middlesbrough High School, and captained their under-15 basketball team to the English Schools championship in 1963.

Honours 
 Darlington F.C. Player of the Year: 1974–75

References

1947 births
Living people
Footballers from Middlesbrough
English footballers
Association football forwards
Middlesbrough F.C. players
Carlisle United F.C. players
Brentford F.C. players
Darlington F.C. players
Whitby Town F.C. players
Guisborough Town F.C. players
English Football League players
Northern Football League players